Jack Du Brul (born October 15, 1968 in Burlington, Vermont) is an American author who writes techno-thriller novels.

Early life
Du Brul remained in Vermont throughout his childhood. He attended the Westminster School in Connecticut for grades 9 through 12. After college he moved to Florida, where he wrote his first book. He currently lives in Virginia.

Career
Du Brul's novels focus on his character, Dr. Philip Mercer, a successful mining engineer and geologist, who gets involved in various threats to the world. He has written eight Phillip Mercer books in the series, beginning with Vulcan's Forge.

Later, Du Brul co-authored "The Oregon Files" novels with Clive Cussler, taking over from Craig Dirgo with the third novel. The latest novel, Mirage, was a New York Times bestseller and his last novel in the series. But more recently took on co-authoring the Isaac Bell novels with The Titanic Secret, the 11th.

Works

Philip Mercer
 Vulcan's Forge (1998)
 Charon's Landing (1999)
 The Medusa Stone (2000)
 Pandora's Curse (2001)
 River of Ruin (2002)
 Deep Fire Rising (2003)
 Havoc (2006)
 The Lightning Stones (2015)

Oregon Files (with Clive Cussler)
 Dark Watch (2005)
 Skeleton Coast (2006)
 Plague Ship (2008)
 Corsair (2009)
 The Silent Sea (2010)
 The Jungle (2011)
 Mirage (2013)

Isaac Bell Adventures (with Clive Cussler)
 The Titanic Secret (2019)
 The Saboteurs (2021)
 The Sea Wolves (2022)

References

External links
Official author's site
 Interview with Philip Mercer
 Complete Bibliography
Modern Signed Books BlogTalkRadio Interview with Rodger Nichols October 2015

1968 births
Living people
Techno-thriller writers
American thriller writers
American spy fiction writers
Westminster School (Connecticut) alumni
20th-century American novelists
21st-century American novelists
American male novelists
20th-century American male writers
21st-century American male writers